World Series of Fighting 30: Branch vs. Starks was a mixed martial arts event held on  at the Hard Rock Hotel and Casino in Las Vegas, Nevada.

Background
The event was headlined by a WSOF Middleweight Championship fight between champion David Branch and Clifford Starks. The co-headliner was a fight between Jon Fitch and João Zeferino for the vacant WSOF Welterweight Championship. After Rousimar Palhares was stripped of the title for holding the submission too long in the fight against Jake Shields, Fitch and Shields were originally expected to fight for the vacant title, but Shields pulled out of the fight, citing an disagreement over his contract.

Results

See also
List of WSOF events
List of WSOF champions

References

World Series of Fighting events
2016 in mixed martial arts
Hard Rock Hotel and Casino (Las Vegas)
2016 in sports in Nevada